Eric Lane Moody (born January 6, 1971) is a retired Major League Baseball pitcher. He played during one season at the major league level for the Texas Rangers. He was drafted by the Rangers in the 24th round of the 1993 amateur draft.

References
"Eric Moody Statistics". The Baseball Cube. 7 January 2008.
"Eric Moody Statistics". Baseball-Reference. 7 January 2008.

1971 births
Living people
Major League Baseball pitchers
Texas Rangers players
Erskine Flying Fleet baseball players
Baseball players from South Carolina
Nashville Sounds players
Hudson Valley Renegades players
Erie Sailors players